This is a list of campuses and centers affiliated with Johns Hopkins University.

Research Centers and Institutes

Other Campuses & Centers

The Bayview Medical Center
Howard County General Hospital
The Bologna Center, Italy
Hopkins-Nanjing Center for Chinese and American Studies, China
Singapore Conservatory of Music
Peabody Institute
Johns Hopkins All Children's Hospital

 
 
Johns Hopkins University
University research institutes